The Leh–Manali Highway is a  long highway in northernmost India connecting Leh, the capital of the Union Territory of Ladakh, to Manali in the state of Himachal Pradesh. It connects the Kullu Valley of the upper Beas river to the Chandra and Bhaga river valleys of Lahaul via the Atal tunnel in Himachal Pradesh, then crosses over a series of high Himalayan passes into the Indus river valley in Ladakh. It is usually open for about six months a year from the first week of May when the snow is cleared from the highway to October when snowfall again blocks the high passes on the highway. Before the construction of the Atal tunnel, the highway used to remain closed beyond the Rohtang Pass during winter. With the completion of the proposed Shingo La Tunnel on an alternate route through Zanskar valley, targeted to be completed by 2025, the whole Leh-Manali route will become an all-weather road.

The Leh–Manali Highway acts as a trunk route for various India-China Border Roads in Ladakh and Himachal Pradesh. It has been designed, built, and maintained by the Border Roads Organisation (BRO) of the Indian army. It supports the heaviest army vehicles.

History
The work on the Leh-Manali road was started in 1964 and its construction was taken up from both ends. In 1989, the 473-km Manali-Leh road began serving as the second land approach to Ladakh.

Geographical features
It is flanked by mountain ranges on both sides, featuring stunning sand and natural rock formations. The landscape changes after getting past the Atal tunnel and the greenery starts receding upon entering the Chandra river valley in the Lahaul region that lies in the rain-shadow. After crossing Darcha, the greenery completely disappears and the mountain slopes on the leeward side become brown and arid. Most of the mountain peaks and highway Pass north of Darcha remain covered by snow even in summer and shine brightly in the sun. Adjacent glaciers melt (more so as the day wears on) and water overruns the highway in many places. This water is ice-cold and travelers should avoid situations where they might have to wade through it.

Road surface

The Leh-Manali highway is generally two lanes wide (one lane in each direction) without a road divider but has only one or one and a half lanes at some stretches. Snow and rain can make the highway slushy or too slippery to travel. Past precipitation can also create travel hazards. It has over a dozen Bailey bridges and all of them are now being upgraded to two-lane steel bridges. The highway crosses many streams of ice-cold water from snow-capped mountains and glacial melts without a bridge and it requires driving skill to negotiate fast-flowing streams. The highway has many damaged stretches and under-maintained portions, where even a little rainfall can trigger dangerous landslides. The road quality is poor from Zingzingbar to Pang and one has to drive carefully as high speed can cause discomfort.

Climate

Ladakh is a cold semi-arid desert. It is cold along the highway even in summer (May onwards); the days are warm in bright sunshine but the nights are very cold. Light woolens are required during the day and thick woolens are required at night. There is scanty rainfall between Darcha and Leh even during the monsoon season in July–September as the entire region lies in rain shadow.

Length of highway
It has  in Himachal Pradesh as the length in Himachal Pradesh is shortened by about  after the opening of the Atal Tunnel avoiding the Rohtang Pass , and 250 km (156 mi) in Ladakh. The state line is at Sarchu.

Earlier Route
In Himachal Pradesh:

  1:  Manali (altitude ) to Marhi at  elevation . It is a steady climb. 
  2:  Marhi to Rohtang Pass at  elevation . It is a steady climb. 
  3:  Rohtang to Gramphu at  elevation  . It is a steady descent. The right turn (towards east) at Gramphu leads to Spiti valley, Batal, Kunzum La and Kaza on a road along Chandra river that is unpaved until Kunzum Pass and beyond.
  4: Gramphu to Koksar, the first village north of Rohtang Pass . Foreign nationals have to show their passports with a valid visas at the police check post here.
  5: Koksar to Sissu at  elevation . The highway runs along the left (south) bank of the Chandra River, with a beautiful waterfall on the other side of the river.
After this, there is the main route from Sissu as mentioned above.

Travel time
After the opening of the Atal Tunnel, the journey from Manali to Leh normally requires one overnight stay en route (Overnight accommodations are described below). Travel time is unpredictable since the weather and road conditions can change suddenly. However, it is now possible to cover the entire journey from Manali to Leh in 14-16 hours in a single day, if there are no road blockades and traffic jams en route.

The peak travel season is during May-June and September-October when tourists visit Atal tunnel, Rohtang pass, and Lahaul valley. Most of the domestic tourists return to Manali on the same day. Himachal Road Transport Corporation (HRTC) and Himachal Pradesh Tourism Development Corporation (HPTDC) operate buses that travel the entire highway in two days. Buses start from Manali at 4 am until 6 pm. The travel time from Manali to Keylong is now approximately 2 hours via the Atal tunnel. Private four-wheel drive taxis are available. Shared taxis are cheap as they charge per person, but they may be full of local residents. The tourist cannot stop either a bus or a shared taxi for sightseeing. Many bikers travel from Manali to Leh and other places in Ladakh on motorcycles, generally in a group.

Fuel stations
Now, a new fuel station at Keylong has become operational since September 2021. Motorists and bikers should fill up at the start of this stretch. Motorcycles and vehicles with small tanks should carry additional fuel in cans. In an emergency, fuel may be available at villages and campsites en route (Jispa, Zingzingbar, Sarchu, Pang, etc.), but this fuel may be adulterated and costly.

Altitude sickness
At high altitudes, the air is thin and contains less oxygen. Acute mountain sickness is possible, whose symptoms include headache, nausea, dizziness, and vomiting. It can be fatal. A traveler arriving by air from lower terrain should acclimate to the high altitude by staying at least one night at the starting point (say, Manali), and plan to stay over at either Keylong, Jispa or Darcha before ascending to the highway's highest passes and plains after Darcha. Travelers should minimize the time spent at high altitudes and therefore not stay over at Sarchu or Pang. They should carry chocolates, glucose, or other high-energy food on the journey.

Accommodation

There are a variety of hotels to suit all budgets at the highway's two ends - Manali and Leh. There are also hotels and PWD rest houses at Sissu and at Keylong (a district headquarter). There is one luxury hotel at Jispa.

Guesthouses are available at Sissu, Keylong, Jispa, Rumtse, Upshi, and Karu.

The remaining option is to sleep in a tent which is generally basic and inexpensive. Luxury and comfortable tents (Swiss-cottage tents) are available in Jispa and Sarchu. Tent accommodations are also available in  Darcha, Zingzingbar, Bharatpur (below Baralacha La pass, inhabited only during tourist season), and Pang. In India, a dhaba is a roadside eatery with low prices and no frills. These are found at some otherwise uninhabited places along the highway. A dhaba is not a motel but many dhabas let the customers lie down and rest, and some can provide an inexpensive dormitory bed (without a private toilet).

See also 
National Highway 3 (India)
More plains
Atal Tunnel
Nimmu–Padam–Darcha road
Bilaspur–Leh railway(proposed)

References

External links
Leh–Manali Highway on OpenStreetMap
 Mountain Passes along the route
 Riding on the Manali-Leh route
 Leh-Manali Highway
 Manali-Leh Highway on Bikemap (with GPS-track)
 Photos of a bike tour along the Highway from 1996.
 Ladakh detailed map
  U.S. Army Map Service
 Manali to leh motorcycle tour map
55 Spectacular Pictures of Leh Manali Highway

Scenic roads in India
Roads in Himachal Pradesh
Himalayas
Transport in Leh
Transport in Manali, Himachal Pradesh
National Highways in Ladakh